The Greek Orthodox Archdiocese of America, headquartered in New York City, is an eparchy of the Ecumenical Patriarchate of Constantinople. Its current primate is Archbishop Elpidophoros of America.

Archbishop
On May 11, 2019, the church's Holy and Sacred Synod unanimously elected Metropolitan Elpidophoros of Bursa as the new archbishop of America following the voluntary resignation of Archbishop Demetrios.  In addition to serving as Metropolitan of Bursa, Elpidophoros has also served as Abbot of the Holy Monastery of the Holy Trinity in Halki and Professor of the Theological School of the Aristoteleian University of Thessaloniki. Metropolitan Methodios of Boston served as the locum tenens until Elpidophoros was enthroned on June 22, 2019.

 Archbishop Elpidophros serves the Greek Orthodox Archdiocese of America. He serves as:
 Primate of the Greek Orthodox Church in America
 Exarch of the Ecumenical Patriarchate
 President of the Holy Eparchial Synod
 Chairman of the Assembly of Canonical Orthodox Bishops of the United States of America

Episcopal details include:
 Consecrated as Metropolitan of Bursa March 20, 2011
 Elected as Archbishop of America May 11, 2019
 Enthroned as Archbishop of America on June 22, 2019

Mission 
The mission of the archdiocese is to proclaim the Gospel of Christ, to teach and spread the Orthodox Christian faith, to energize, cultivate, and guide the life of the Church in the United States of America according to the Orthodox Christian faith and tradition.

The Greek Orthodox Church in America considers that it sanctifies the faithful through divine worship, especially the Holy Eucharist and other sacraments, building the spiritual and ethical life of the faithful in accordance with the Holy Scriptures, Sacred Tradition, the doctrines and canons of the Ecumenical and local Councils, the canons of the Holy Apostles and the Fathers of the Church and of all other Councils recognized by the Orthodox Church.

The archdiocese states that it serves as a beacon, carrier, and witness of the message of Christ to all persons who live in the United States of America, through divine worship, preaching, teaching, and living of the Orthodox Christian faith.

History 

Before the establishment of a Greek Archdiocese in the Western Hemisphere there were numerous communities of Greek Orthodox Christians. On June 26, 1768, the first Greek colonists landed at St. Augustine, Florida, the oldest city in America. The first Greek Orthodox community in the Americas was founded in 1864, in New Orleans, Louisiana, by a small colony of Greek merchants.  The first permanent community was founded in New York City in 1892, today's Archdiocesan Cathedral of the Holy Trinity and the See of the Archbishop of America.  The Greek Orthodox Archdiocese of North and South America was incorporated in 1921 and officially recognized by the State of New York in 1922.

In 1908, the Church of Greece received authority over the Greek Orthodox congregation of America, but in 1922 Patriarch Meletius IV of Constantinople transferred the archdiocese back to the jurisdiction of the Church of Constantinople.  In 1996, the archdiocese was split by the Ecumenical Patriarchate, into four separate archdioceses: those of America (the USA), Canada, Central America, and South America.

By 2019, there were rumors, that the Greek Orthodox Archdiocese of America was suffering financially and was now in "financial, administrative, and spiritual bankruptcy."

Holy Eparchial Synod 
The Holy Eparchial Synod of the archdiocese is composed of:
 Archbishop Elpidophoros (Lambriniadis) of America, President
 Metropolitan Methodios (Tournas) of Boston 
 Metropolitan Isaiah (Chronopoulos) of Denver
 Metropolitan Alexios (Panagiotopoulos) of Atlanta
 Metropolitan Nicholas (Pissaris) of Detroit                              
 Metropolitan Savas (Zembillas) of Pittsburgh
 Metropolitan Gerasimos (Michaleas) of San Francisco                           
 Metropolitan Nathanael (Symeonides) of Chicago

Organization
The Greek Orthodox Archdiocese of America is composed of an archdiocesan district (New York City) and eight metropolises (formerly dioceses): New Jersey, Chicago, Atlanta, Detroit, San Francisco, Pittsburgh, Boston and Denver. It is governed by the archbishop and the Eparchial Synod of Metropolitans. The synod is headed by the archbishop (as the first among equals) and comprises the metropolitans who oversee the ministry and operations of their respective metropolises. It has all the authority and responsibility which the Church canons provide for a provincial synod.

There are more than 500 parishes, 800 priests and approximately 440,000 to 2 million faithful in the Greek Orthodox Archdiocese of America, depending on the source of reports and the counting method being used. The number of parishes in the Greek Archdiocese rose by about 9% in the decade from 1990 to 2000, and membership growth has largely been in terms of existing members having children. Membership is concentrated in the Northeastern United States. The states with the highest rates of adherence are Massachusetts, New Hampshire, Rhode Island, and New York.

The archdiocese receives within its ranks and under its spiritual aegis and pastoral care Orthodox Christians, who either as individuals or as organized groups in the Metropolises and Parishes have voluntarily come to it and which acknowledge the ecclesiastical and canonical jurisdiction of the Ecumenical Patriarchate.

Additionally, one seminary is operated by the Greek Archdiocese, Holy Cross Greek Orthodox School of Theology in Brookline, Massachusetts, which educates not only Greek Archdiocese seminarians but also those from other jurisdictions, as well.

The Greek Orthodox Archdiocese of America was a member of SCOBA and is a member of its successor organization, the Assembly of Canonical Orthodox Bishops of the United States of America.

Parishes 
The Greek Orthodox Archdiocese comprises some 525 parishes and 20 monasteries across the United States of America.

Episcopacy

Diocesan bishops
 Archbishop Elpidophoros (Lambriniadis) of America
 Metropolitan Methodios (Tournas) of Boston 
 Metropolitan Isaiah (Chronopoulos) of Denver
 Metropolitan Alexios (Panagiotopoulos) of Atlanta
 Metropolitan Nicholas (Pissare) of Detroit
 Metropolitan Gerasimos (Michaleas) of San Francisco
 Metropolitan Savas (Zembillas) of Pittsburgh (elected November 2, 2011; enthronement December 8, 2011)
 Metropolitan Evangelos (Kourounis) of New Jersey
 Metropolitan Nathanael (Symeonides) of Chicago

(This is the actual hierarchical seniority order and formal listing of the bishops.)

Auxiliary bishops
 Bishop Demetrios (Kantzavelos) of Mokissos, assigned to the Metropolis of Chicago
 Bishop Sebastianos (Skordallos) of Zela
 Bishop Apostolos (Koufallakis) of Medeia, assigned to the Metropolis of San Francisco
 Bishop Joachim of Amissos
 Bishop Spyridon of Amastris
 Bishop Timothy of Hexamilion
 Bishop Ioannis of Phocaea
 Bishop Constantine of Sassima

Retired bishops
 Metropolitan Maximos (Aghiorgoussis) of Pittsburgh( reposed in November 2020)
 Bishop Iakovos (Pililis) of Catania( reposed in June 2018)
 Metropolitan Philotheos (Karamitsos) of Meloa (reposed in May 2017)
 Metropolitan Dimitrios (Couchell) of Xanthos, Elevated to Metropolitan in January 2023

Former Archbishops of America 
 Alexander (Demoglou), 1922–1930
 Athenagoras (Spyrou), 1931–1948
 Timotheos Evangelinidis, 1949 (elected, but reposed before taking office)
 Michael (Konstantinides), 1950–1958
 Iakovos (Coucouzis), 1959–1997
 Spyridon (Papageorge), 1997–1999
 Demetrios (Trakatellis), 1999–2019

Deceased hierarchs
 Archbishop Athenagoras (Cavadas) of Thyateira and Great Britain (formerly of Boston)
 Archbishop Athenagoras (Kokkinakis) of Thyateira and Great Britain
 Metropolitan Anthony (Gergiannakis) of San Francisco
 Metropolitan Germanos (Polyzoides) of Hierapolis
 Metropolitan Iakovos (Garmatis) of Chicago
 Metropolitan Joachim (Alexopoulos) of Demetrias (formerly of Boston)
 Metropolitan Philaretos (Johannides) of Syros (formerly of Chicago)
 Metropolitan Silas (Koskinas) of Saranta Ekklesia (formerly of New Jersey)
 Bishop Aimilianos (Laloussis) of Harioupolis
 Bishop Eirinaios (Tsourounakis) of San Francisco
 Bishop George (Papaioannou) of New Jersey
 Bishop Gerasimos (Papadopoulos) of Abydos
 Bishop Germanos (Liamadis) of Constantia
 Bishop Germanos (Psallidakis) of Synadon
 Bishop Kallistos (Papageorgapoulos) of San Francisco
 Bishop Meletios (Diacandrew) of Aristeas
 Bishop Meletios (Tripodakis) of Christianopoulis
 Bishop Paul (deBallester) of Nazianzos
 Bishop Philip (Koutoufas) of Atlanta
 Bishop Theodosius (Sideris) of Ancona
 Bishop Timothy (Haloftis) of Detroit
 Metropolitan Philotheos (Karamitsos) of Meloa

Administration

Office of the Chancellor
The Office of the Chancellor is concerned with the well-being of the clergy, their ongoing assignments and reassignments, their continuing education, and the benefits provided to them by the Church. Recent chancellor of the Archdiocese Bishop Andonios of Phasiane submitted his letter of resignation in May 2019.

Archdiocesan institutions
Information about different institutions throughout the United States which are part of the Greek Orthodox Archdiocese of America.

Archdiocesan Cathedral of Holy Trinity

The Archdiocesan Cathedral of the Holy Trinity provides regular divine worship, counseling, Christian education, human services and cultural programs for people in the New York City area.

Hellenic College and Holy Cross School of Theology
Hellenic College and Holy Cross Greek Orthodox School of Theology together constitute a Greek Orthodox Christian institution of higher learning providing undergraduate and graduate education. Located on a  campus in Brookline, Massachusetts, Hellenic College and Holy Cross seek to educate leaders, priests, lay persons, men and women.

Others
 Saint Basil Academy (Garrison, New York)

See also
Archbishop of America
Greek Orthodox Church
Greek American
Greek Canadians

Notes

1.The number of adherents given in the "Atlas of American Orthodox Christian Churches" is defined as "individual full members" with the addition of their children. It also includes an estimate of how many are not members but regularly participate in parish life. Regular attendees includes only those who regularly attend church and regularly participate in church life.

References

Citations

External links 

 
 Official Website of the Orthodox Patriarchate of Constantinople
 Profile of the Greek Orthodox Archdiocese of America on the Association of Religion Data Archives website

 
Eastern Orthodox Church bodies in North America
Christian organizations established in 1921
Organizations based in New York City
Members of the World Council of Churches
Eastern Orthodox organizations established in the 20th century
Dioceses established in the 20th century
Members of the National Council of Churches
1921 establishments in New York (state)
 USA